Katherine Louisa Ryan (born 30 June 1983) is a Canadian comedian, writer, presenter, actress and singer based in the United Kingdom.

She has appeared on many British panel shows, including as a regular team captain on 8 Out of 10 Cats and Never Mind the Buzzcocks, A League of Their Own, Mock the Week, Would I Lie to You?, QI, Just a Minute, Safeword, and Have I Got News for You. In 2015, she replaced Steve Jones as the presenter of Hair on BBC Two. As an actress, Ryan has appeared on numerous television series in the UK, including the sitcoms Campus, Episodes, and her Netflix show The Duchess.

As a stand-up comedian, Ryan has appeared on the BBC's Live at the Apollo, both as a featured act and as a lead act. She has had two live stand-up specials released on Netflix: Katherine Ryan: In Trouble (2017) and Katherine Ryan: Glitter Room (2019).

Early life
Ryan's father, Finbar, is a draughtsman and owner of an engineering company who originally emigrated from Ireland to Canada. Her mother Julie McCarthy is British/Canadian and owns an IT consulting company. Ryan and her two younger sisters were born and raised in Sarnia, Ontario.

Ryan's parents separated when she was a teenager. When she was 18, she decided to leave home and chose to study city planning at Toronto Metropolitan University (formerly Ryerson University) in Toronto. While attending university, she worked at restaurant chain Hooters, and she then began training other waitresses. In her spare time she undertook open mic nights as an alternative form of personal entertainment, and by graduation, she had developed a basic comedic routine. She was one of the many dancers in MuchMusic's Electric Circus program.

Career
After graduation, Ryan continued working for Hooters as a corporate trainer, travelling around Canada to train other waitresses, and helping to open the then-only UK branch in Nottingham. Her partner at the time wanted to explore London, so she agreed to do so for an initial month from summer 2007, moving there permanently from January 2008.

As a comedian 

Ryan won the Funny Women award in 2008, Rachel Stubbings and Sara Pascoe were runners up.

Ryan first appeared on television as herself in episodes of the Canadian music video review show Video on Trial between season one in 2005 and her last appearance in 2008 in season three. After relocating to England, she first appeared on Channel 4's 8 Out of 10 Cats in 2012. She had previously appeared in the cast of Channel 4's Campus. On 23 February 2013, she appeared as a celebrity contestant on BBC One's Let's Dance for Comic Relief as Nicki Minaj dancing to "Starships". Ryan reached the final, and finished in fourth place. Ryan was later featured on the Whitney Cummings Just for Laughs 2013 Gala that was taped before a live audience on 28 July 2013. She has since taken new routines to the Edinburgh Festival.

In 2015, Ryan replaced Steve Jones as the presenter of Hair on BBC Two. Also in 2015, Ryan became a panellist for Tinie Tempah's team on Sky 1's music/comedy panel show Bring the Noise and on the ITV2 show, Safeword. In 2016, Ryan appeared on series 2 of Taskmaster. She beat Doc Brown, Joe Wilkinson, Richard Osman and Jon Richardson, to win the season.

Ryan went on a comedy tour in 2016, called Kathbum, a name her toddler sister used to call her. In February 2017, Netflix released Katherine Ryan: In Trouble, featuring her stand-up comedy live performance at the Hammersmith Apollo in London, during that tour.

She joined Jimmy Carr in 2017 to host four series of the reboot of Your Face or Mine?. In 2018, Ryan joined American comedy panel show, The Fix as a team captain. In July 2019, Netflix released her second live stand-up special, Katherine Ryan: Glitter Room.

Actress
As an actress, Ryan has appeared on numerous television series in the UK, including the sitcoms Campus, Episodes and Badults. Ryan stars in the August 2020 season 1, Netflix comedy The Duchess, based on a single mother's life in London; she is credited as its writer, executive producer, and creator.

Other work 
On 6 June 2014, YouTube comedy duo Jack and Dean released a music video for their song "Consent" featuring Ryan in an acting role.

In 2015 and 2016 Ryan wrote a weekly column in the British entertainment magazine NME. In 2016 she featured in Disney XD and Teletoon's animated television series Counterfeit Cat, where she voiced Ranceford, the stuck-up, white, odd-eyed cat and leader of the Sunshine Circle for Cats.

In 2021 Ryan hosted the six-part reality competition All That Glitters: Britain's Next Jewellery Star on BBC2.  Also in 2021 she presented the ITV2 dating show Ready to Mingle.

In November 2022 Ryan was the subject of an interview in the BBC series Louis Theroux Interviews... with Louis Theroux,  during which she told Theroux about the "open secret" of an alleged sexual abuser who was a prominent TV personality.

In January 2023, Ryan appeared as "Pigeon" on the fourth series of The Masked Singer.

Recognition
For her comedy work, Ryan won the 2008 Funny Women Award and was described as "the funniest new female stand up in Britain" by a national newspaper.

In February 2023, Ryan won the Outstanding Female Comedy Entertainment Performance award at the 2023 National Comedy Awards for Backstage with Katherine Ryan.

Personal life
Ryan dated English actor and TV presenter Jeff Leach and had a relationship with American comedian Alex Edelman.

In 2019, Ryan entered into a civil partnership with Bobby Kootstra. The ceremony took place in Denmark in the presence of her daughter. The two had dated in Canada as teenagers and were reunited when Ryan returned to her hometown while filming an episode of the TV show Who Do You Think You Are?  Her second child, a son, was born in June 2021. Her third child, a daughter, was born in December 2022.

Filmography

References

External links 

21st-century Canadian comedians
1983 births
Canadian expatriates in England
Canadian people of Irish descent
Canadian stand-up comedians
Canadian women comedians
Comedians from Ontario
Living people
People from Crouch End
People from Sarnia
Toronto Metropolitan University alumni
Hooters people
All That Glitters: Britain's Next Jewellery Star